"Human on the Inside" is a song originally recorded by Australian rock duo Divinyls, released in 1996 as the fourth single from their fifth studio album Underworld.  A minor hit in Australia in 1996, the song became better known after it was covered by The Pretenders in 1999 under the title "Human".  In this version, the song became a 1999 chart hit in the UK, New Zealand and the US.

Background
"Human on the Inside" was one of many tracks from the album Underworld to be produced by Divinyls drummer Charley Drayton. The two previously released singles "I'm Jealous" and "Heart of Steel" were produced by Peter Collins and Keith Forsey respectively, and although "I'm Jealous" was a hit, "Heart of Steel" did not even chart. This created an air of doubt as to whether a third single would be successful. "Human on the Inside" did manage to chart but only peaked at #59 on the Australian ARIA singles chart. Likewise, the album Underworld proved to be unsuccessful and only just made the top fifty of the Albums Chart.

Track listing
Australian CD Single
 "Human on the Inside" - 4:12
 "I Ain't Gonna Eat Out My Heart Anymore" - 4:30
 "Human on the Inside" (Lonely Mix) - 4:08

Charts

The Pretenders version
This song was covered by The Pretenders (as "Human") on their 1999 album, Viva el Amor.  Issued as a single, the track peaked at #33 UK and #17 New Zealand.  In the US, it made #30 on the Adult top 40.

It appeared on the soundtrack of the 2000 film Saving Grace. It also appeared in the Charmed season one episode "Love Hurts" as the post credits song. It was the theme song for the American television series Cupid (1998-1999) starring Jeremy Piven and Paula Marshall.

Charts

References

1996 singles
Songs written by Shelly Peiken
Songs written by Mark McEntee
Divinyls songs
1996 songs
Bertelsmann Music Group singles